Human After All is the third studio album by French electronic music duo Daft Punk, first released on 14 March 2005 through Virgin Records. Unlike their previous studio album Discovery (2001), whose sound was inspired by disco and garage house and produced over the period of two years, Human After All was more minimalistic and improvisational with a mixture of heavier guitars and electronics, and was produced in six weeks.

Human After All received mixed reviews from critics, who derided its minimalistic, repetitive nature and its six-week production time. However, the singles "Robot Rock" and "Technologic" charted in several countries, while the title track charted in France. Daft Punk incorporated the songs into their Alive 2006/2007 tour, which received critical acclaim. Human After All reached number one on the Billboard Dance/Electronic Albums chart, and was nominated for the 2006 Grammy Award for Best Electronic/Dance Album.

Recording
An early press release stated that the record "[retained] their trademark Daft Punk sound, this time with a more spontaneous and direct quality to the recording". Human After Alls brief creation and minimal production had been decided upon beforehand as a counterpoint to Discovery, which had been produced in two years. Thomas Bangalter said that they were "definitely seduced at the time by the idea of doing the opposite of" their previous studio album. He compared the deliberately unpolished record to "a stone that's unworked". 

Human After All was created primarily with two guitars, two drum machines, a vocoder and one eight-track machine. It was produced in six weeks from September to November 2004, with four of those weeks spent mixing. A majority of the album's sound and timbre was crafted by using a DigiTech synth wah effect pedal. Bangalter stated that the album was "about this feeling of either fear or paranoia" and "not something intended to make you feel good". He said that both it and the 2006 film Daft Punk's Electroma are "extremely tormented and sad and terrifying looks at technology, but there can be some beauty and emoting from it". He acknowledged the perceived mechanical quality of the record, but felt that it expressed "the dance between humanity and technology".

At the time of Human After Alls release, Daft Punk considered it their favourite of their albums, and described it as "pure improvisation". Guy-Manuel de Homem-Christo said that every album they made was "tightly linked with our lives" and that "the internal, personal stuff Thomas went through during Human After All made it closer to where he was at the time".

 Release and promotion 
Leading up to the release of Human After All, promotional CDs of the album were distributed with tamper-evident seals, as well as individual watermarks to identify each recipient. Retail copies on CD also implemented Copy Control protection against unauthorized duplication. The album leaked online several months before release, but fans confused by its radically different style initially speculated that it was a fake designed to foil online filesharing. 

In 2013, Spin wrote that the official release of the album had been ill-timed, as it occurred after the end of the "major-label electronica movement" of the 1990s, but before the rise of independent dance labels such as DFA Records and Ed Banger. Daft Punk gave no interviews to promote the album, as they felt this would run contrary to the album's theme of the media as an oppressive force. The only official statement given by Daft Punk at the time was: "We believe that Human After All speaks for itself". De Homem-Christo later said that choosing to be silent was the biggest mistake they had ever made.

Bangalter emphasized that their only promotion for the album would be through its music videos. To that end, Daft Punk directed the videos for "Robot Rock" and "Technologic", having previously directed the video for their song "Fresh". Tony Gardner directed the video for "The Prime Time of Your Life", though Bangalter predicted that it would be impractical for promotional use due to its graphic content. Daft Punk intended to make a video for the song "Human After All" as well, but the footage they shot for it was expanded to create the film Daft Punk's Electroma instead. Songs from Human After All also appear in the Daft Punk compilation Musique Vol. 1 1993–2005 and the live album Alive 2007.

The cover image of Human After All features the Daft Punk logo displayed on a television screen. Each single from the album features a cover with a different image on a similar screen. Bangalter cited the novel Nineteen Eighty-Four by George Orwell as an inspiration for the record.

Sales
The album topped the Billboard Top Dance/Electronic Albums chart and peaked at number 98 on the Billboard 200. It peaked at number three in France and received a double gold certification from the Syndicat National de l'Édition Phonographique (SNEP) one month after its release. It also received a silver certification from the British Phonographic Industry (BPI) in the United Kingdom, where it peaked at number 10. As of May 2013, the album has sold 127,000 copies in the US and 80,838 copies in the UK. The first single from the album, "Robot Rock", received moderate attention, reaching number 32 in the UK and number 15 on the Billboard Hot Dance Club Songs chart, but was not a major hit."Daft Punk Chart History" Billboard Hot Dance Club Songs for Daft Punk. Retrieved 16 October 2017. The second single, "Technologic", only hit number 40 in the UK but did considerably better in airplay and was featured in an iPod commercial. The title track "Human After All" reached number 93 in France.

Critical reception

At Metacritic, which assigns a normalized rating out of 100 to reviews from mainstream critics, Human After All received an average score of 57, indicating "mixed or average reviews", based on 28 reviews. In his review for Blender magazine, Simon Reynolds said that Discoverys blissful and "open-hearted" music had been replaced by "an archly ironic dance-rock that feels desultory and numb – verging on autistic". Q felt that it lacked the "fun" of Daft Punk's previous work. Barry Walters of Rolling Stone said that the duo generally "repeats rather than elaborates its riffs", and that they "exaggerate their band's own robotic tendencies here, much to the detriment of its grooves". Dorian Lynskey of The Guardian called the album "a joyless collection of average ideas stretched desperately thin". Robert Christgau from The Village Voice graded the album a "dud", indicating "a bad record whose details rarely merit further thought". 

In a positive review, Matthew Weiner of Stylus Magazine stated, "it's the same story, track after track, willfully mistaking alternation for variation, intensification for development and dynamics. In other words, a shining example of pop songcraft in the 21st century". Mojo magazine said that it "strips out the most flamboyant frills to create a more incisive sound". Human After All was nominated for the 2006 Grammy Award for Best Electronic/Dance Album, but lost to the Chemical Brothers album Push the Button.

 Legacy 
The Alive 2006/2007 tour, which featured songs from Human After All, caused many to reassess the album. Pedro Winter, Daft Punk's manager at the time, stated, "When we put out Human After All, I got a lot of bad feedback, like, 'It's so repetitive. There's nothing new. Daft Punk used to be good.' Then they came back with the light show, and everyone shut their mouths... People even apologized, like, 'How could we have misjudged Daft Punk?' The live show changed everything. Even if I'm part of it, I like to step back and admire it. Me, I cried." Bangalter said that the album "was the music we wanted to make at the time we did it. We have always strongly felt there was a logical connection between our three albums, and it's great to see that people seem to realize that when they listen now to the live show".

Track listing

"Robot Rock" contains a sample of "Release the Beast" performed by Breakwater.

Personnel
Adapted from the Human After All liner notes.

 Daft Punk – vocals, guitars, drum machines, synthesizers, piano, bass guitar, vocoder, programming, production
 Cédric Hervet – production coordination
 Gildas Loaëc – production coordination
 Nilesh Patel – mastering

Remix albumHuman After All: Remixes''' is an album consisting of various remixes of songs from Human After All'' by musicians such as Soulwax and Justice. It was originally released on 29 March 2006 exclusively in Japan. On 17 June 2014, a reissue of the album was released, also exclusive to Japan. The new edition featured four additional bonus tracks. On 9 August 2014, this version of the album was silently released internationally for the first time, containing an additional remix of "Technologic" by Le Knight Club.

Track listing

Charts

Weekly charts

Year-end charts

Certifications

References

External links
 
 

2005 albums
Daft Punk albums
Dance-rock albums
Virgin Records albums
Albums produced by Thomas Bangalter
Albums produced by Guy-Manuel de Homem-Christo